Stephen Hague (born 1960) is an American record producer most active with various British acts since the 1980s.

Early life
Hague was born in Portland, Maine in 1960.

Early career
Hague started his musical career in the mid-1970s as a session keyboardist. He soon became a member of the band Jules and the Polar Bears and produced (with Jules Shear) the two albums and one EP, released between 1978 and 1980, by that band. He then branched out into producing work by other artists, including 1980s Sparks offshoot band Gleaming Spires, their first album being recorded on Hague's home 4-track tape recorder. This 1981 album spawned the Los Angeles radio hit "Are You Ready for the Sex Girls?" on the Posh Boy label, a recording subsequently featured in Hollywood features The Last American Virgin and Revenge of the Nerds. Hague and Shear teamed up to produce both albums by new-wavers Slow Children in 1981 and 1982; Hague also co-produced Elliot Easton's (The Cars) 1985 solo album Change No Change.

Commercial successes
Hague's first noted UK production was on Malcolm McLaren's "Madam Butterfly" single. He later worked with Orchestral Manoeuvres in the Dark, Public Image Ltd., Pet Shop Boys, New Order, Jimmy Somerville, Melanie C, James, Peter Gabriel, Dubstar, Erasure, Pretenders, Blur, Pere Ubu, Robert Palmer, a-ha, Siouxsie and the Banshees, Robbie Williams, Tom Jones and Robbie Robertson, producing the hits "So In Love", "West End Girls", "It's A Sin", "Go West", "True Faith", "Regret", "Bizarre Love Triangle", and "A Little Respect" among many others.

Production credits

1980s

1990s

2000-present

References

External links
Biography on MP3.com (archived on 12 February 2005)

Record producers from Maine
Musicians from Portland, Maine
Living people
1960 births
Businesspeople from Portland, Maine